Coenochroa prolixa is a species of snout moth in the genus Coenochroa. It was described by Jay C. Shaffer in 1989. It is found in Brazil.

References

Moths described in 1989
Phycitinae